Kaiai  is a village in central Gambia on the Gambia River. It is located in Niani District in the Central River Division.  As of 2009, it has an estimated population of 816.

References

Populated places in the Gambia